Tezkire, from Arabic tadhkirah meaning "something that causes one to remember" or "memorandum", is a form of bibliographical dictionary or bibliographical compendium which flourished in the 16th-century Ottoman Empire. The most known are the tezkires of poets, but they also dealt with government officials, and of artists in general. First seen in the early Arab literature before the 10th century, they came into the Persian literature and later into the Ottoman one.

One of the most famous tezkires in the Persian language is the Tazkirat al-Awliya of Fariduddin Attar. The most important tezkire in the Chagatai-Turkic is Majolis un-Nafois by Ali-Shir Nava'i.

Ottoman poetry tezkires
The tezkires of poets were written between the 16th and 20th centuries in the Anatolian area. They contain information on both poets and their poetic work,  and are written both in prose and verses making the tezkire genre unique. A valuable source of information for today's scholars, they also present a type of ego-document due to the combination of objective with subjective material. The bibliographical notices mention birthplace, family, teachers, profession, personal anecdotes, comments on personality or character, place and date of death, and quotations from poetry.

The first tezkire of Ottoman literature was named Heşt Behişt (Eight Springs). It was the work of Sehi Bey of Edirne (1471?-1548) and was completed in 1538. 2 other editions would follow until 1548. It narrated the work and life of 241 poets and was very well received and supported by the Ottoman high social circles.

A distinguished tezkire is the Tezkiretü'ş-Şuara (Memoirs of the Poets) of Latifî of Kastamonu (1491-1582), the second in chronology and is the one with most extant copies (91). It was finished and presented to Sultan Suleiman I in 1546. Another important one comes from Aşık Çelebi; Meşairü'ş-Şuara (Senses of Poets), published in 1568, covers the work and life of 427 poets. It is the 3rd in chronology, and the second by the number of extant copies (30). The 4th tezkire is the one from Ahdi of Baghdad, of Persian origin, and is named Gülşen-i Şuara (Rosebed of Poets). Unlike the previous three, it covered only author's time contemporary poets. It was finished in 1563, and was dedicated to Prince Selim, afterwards known as Sultan Selim II.

Other well known tezkire:
Riyazi - Riyazü'ş Şuara
Faizi - Zübtedü'l-Eşar 
Mirzade Mehmed Efendi - Salim Tezkiresi
Ali Güfti - Teşrifatü'ş Şuara
Davud Fatin - Haitmetül-Eşar
Kınalızâde Hasan Çelebi - Tezkiretü'ş-Şuara

See also
Diwan poetry

References

Turkish literature
Persian literature
Arabic literature
Turkish words and phrases
Arabic words and phrases